Liu Lina (born 1979-02-20 in Xinjiang) is an Olympic equestrian sportswoman for China. Her best performance is winning the 2006 National Equestrian (Dressage) Championships. She competed at the 2008 Summer Olympics in Beijing in the dressage event.

References

1979 births
Living people
Chinese female equestrians
Chinese dressage riders
Equestrians at the 2008 Summer Olympics
Olympic equestrians of China
Sportspeople from Xinjiang
Asian Games medalists in equestrian
Equestrians at the 2010 Asian Games
Equestrians at the 2014 Asian Games
Asian Games silver medalists for China
Medalists at the 2010 Asian Games
21st-century Chinese women